Infinix Mobile is a smartphone company with headquarters based in China, founded in 2013 by Transsion Holdings. Their phones are manufactured in several countries including France, India, Indonesia, Korea, China, Pakistan and Egypt. They have research and development centers in France and Korea and design their phones in France. Infinix Mobile is available in Asia and approximately 30 countries in the Middle East and Africa. The company was also the first smartphone brand to manufacture in Pakistan.

History 
In 2013, Infinix Mobile was established as a smartphone company. 

In 2017, the company saw an increase in market share in Egypt, positioning itself as the third-largest brand after Samsung and Huawei. 

Infinix was also a sponsor of the Indian Super League team Mumbai City FC during the 20172018 season. 

On May 8, 2018, Infinix Mobile Nigeria entered into a endorsement agreement with musician David Adedeji Adeleke, also known as Davido, to serve as the brand's ambassador in Nigeria.

In June 2020, Infinix Mobility introduced its first range of smart TVs to the Nigerian electronics market. 

In April 2022, Infinix Nigeria announced reality TV star, influencer, and dancer Roseline Afije (Liquorose) as the new face and brand ambassador for its Hot series through its social media platforms.

Products
List of Infinix mobile phones:

Zero Series
Infinix Zero 5G
Infinix Zero 5
Infinix Zero 5 Pro
Infinix Zero 8
Infinix Zero 9
Infinix Zero X Pro
Infinix Zero X
Infinix Zero X Neo
Infinix Zero 20

Note Series 
Infinix Note 12 VIP
Infinix Note 12 Pro
Infinix Note 12
Infinix Note 11i
Infinix Note 11s
Infinix Note 11
Infinix Note 10 Pro NFC
Infinix Note 10 Pro
Infinix Note 10
Infinix Note 7
Infinix Note 7 Lite
Infinix Note 9
Infinix Note 8i
Infinix Note 8
Infinix Note 6

Hot Series
Infinix Hot 11 Play
Infinix Note 11 Pro
Infinix Hot 11s
Infinix Hot 11
Infinix Hot S
Infinix Hot Note
Infinix Hot 12 play
Infinix Hot 10i
Infinix Hot 10T
Infinix Hot 10s NFC
Infinix Hot 10s
Infinix Hot 10 Play
Infinix Hot 8
Infinix Hot 20 Play
Infinix Hot 20s
Infinix Hot 20 5G
Infinix Hot 20i

Smart Series
Infinix Smart 5 Pro
Infinix Smart 6
Infinix Smart 5 (India)
Infinix Smart HD 2021

Infinix Zero 8i
Infinix Note 8
Infinix Note 8i
Infinix Hot 10 Lite
Infinix Hot 10
Infinix Zero 8
Infinix Smart 5
Infinix Hot 9 Play
Infinix Note 7
Infinix Note 7 Lite
Infinix Hot 9 Pro
Infinix Hot 9
Infinix S5 Pro
Infinix S5 Lite
Infinix Smart 4
Infinix Smart 4c
Infinix Hot 8 Lite
Infinix S5
Infinix Hot 8
Infinix Note 6
Infinix Smart 3 Plus
Infinix S4
Infinix Hot 7 Pro
Infinix Hot 7
Infinix Zero 6 Pro
Infinix Zero 6
Infinix Smart 2 HD
Infinix Hot 6X
Infinix Note 5 Stylus
Infinix S3X
Infinix Hot 6
Infinix Note 5
Infinix Smart 2 Pro
Infinix Smart 2
Infinix Hot 6 Pro
Infinix Hot S3
Infinix Zero 5 Pro
Infinix Zero 5
Infinix Hot 5 Lite
Infinix Hot 5
Infinix Note 4 Pro
Infinix Note 4
Infinix Smart 6
Infinix Zero 4 Plus
Infinix Zero 4
Infinix S2 Pro
Infinix Hot 4 Pro
Infinix Hot 4
Infinix Note 3 Pro
Infinix Note 3

Infinix Inbook lXI 
Infinix Inbook XI Slim
Infinix Zero 2023

References

External links 
 

Companies based in Shenzhen
Companies established in 2013
Mobile phone manufacturers
 
Chinese brands
Transsion